The 1996 Beach Soccer World Championships was the second edition of the Beach Soccer World Championships, the most prestigious competition in international beach soccer contested by men's national teams until 2005, when the competition was then replaced by the second iteration of a world cup in beach soccer, the better known FIFA Beach Soccer World Cup. It was organised by Brazilian sports agency Koch Tavares (one of the founding partners of Beach Soccer Worldwide). 

The tournament again took place at Copacabana Beach in Rio de Janeiro, Brazil, as it did during the maiden edition a year earlier.

Brazil successfully defended their title by beating Uruguay 3–0 in what was the lowest scoring final to date, to win their second World Championship. The Uruguayans remained the only side not to score in a world cup final until Tahiti also failed to do so in 2017.

This edition is one of only two world cups after the first (the other being 2003) when no matches went beyond regulation time.

Organisation
The organisation remained the same as the format established for the maiden event in the previous year; the eight participating nations competed in two groups of four teams in a round robin format. The top two teams progressed straight to the semi-finals from which point on the championship was played as a knock-out tournament until a winner was crowned with an additional match to determine third place.

The capacity of the arena used for this edition of the World Championships remained the same as in 1995, at 12,000 seats available for spectators.

Teams
Africa, Asia and Oceania were unrepresented.

European Zone (3):
1

1

North American Zone (2):
1

South American Zone (2):

Hosts:
 (South America)

Group stage

Group A

Group B

Knockout stage

Semi-finals

Third place play-off

Final

Winners

Awards

2. Other sources suggest 13 goals

Final standings

Sources

RSSSF
Roonba

1996
1996
1996 in Brazilian football
1996 in beach soccer